Jelovarnik is the second waterfall in Serbia by height, with total of 71 meters. It is located in the area of Kopaonik national park Jelovarnik, after which it is named. Jelovarnik has elevation of 1,116 meters, and it is approximately 2,5 km east of Pančićev vrh. It was discovered by a group of geologists in 1998, while it was previously known only to the local community. The waterfall is located in a thick forest full of Balkan maple, beech and spruce. Jelovarnik is a natural park, together with accompasing flora and fauna, with total of 57 hectares.

See more 
 Geography of Serbia

References 

Waterfalls of Serbia